George Frank Robie (17 June 1844 - 5 June 1891) was a first lieutenant in the United States Army who was awarded the Medal of Honor for gallantry during the American Civil War. He was awarded the medal on 12 June 1883 for actions performed during the Siege of Petersburg in 1864.

Personal life 
Robie was born on 17 June 1844 in Candia, New Hampshire to parents Nathaniel D. Robie and Ruth Jane Robie (nee Moore). Nathaniel Robie also served in the Army but did not survive the war. Robie had one younger brother, John Freeman Parker Robie, who lived until 1917. After the war, Robie joined the Louis Bell Post of the G.A.R. and helped charter a post in Galveston, Texas. He worked as a bookkeeper. Robie died on 5 June 1891 in Galveston of "rheumatism", most likely liver disease, and is buried in New City Cemetery in Galveston.

Military service 
Before enlisting in New Hampshire, Robie had served a term with the 8th Massachusetts Infantry defending Washington D.C. He enlisted with Company D of the 7th New Hampshire Infantry as a sergeant on 25 September 1861 and was promoted to first sergeant on 28 December 1863. On 15 September 1864, while still a sergeant, Robie demonstrated great bravery during a reconnaissance towards Richmond, which eventually earned him the Medal of Honor. He was promoted to first lieutenant of Company G on 28 October 1864. He was eventually transferred back to Company D and then to Company B before mustering out on 20 July 1865 in Goldsboro, North Carolina.

Robie's Medal of Honor citation reads:

References 

1844 births
1891 deaths
Union Army officers
People from Candia, New Hampshire
United States Army Medal of Honor recipients
American Civil War recipients of the Medal of Honor